Armo  may refer to:
 Armo, a municipality  in the Province of Imperia in the Italian region Liguria 
 Armo District, a district in the northeastern Bari province of Somalia
 ARMO BioSciences, an American pharmaceutical company
 ARMO oil refiner, an oil refiners in Albania
 Armo, a slang term for an Armenian